La Sinistra (Italian for: The Left) may refer to:

 The Left – The Rainbow,, political party in Italy formed in 2007
 The Left (Italy),, political coalition in Italy formed in 2019
 The Left (Switzerland),, political party in Switzerland formed in 2010

See also
 Nu Ophiuchi, a star sometimes referred to by the alternate name Sinistra
 Frédéric Sinistra (1981–2021), Belgian kickboxer
 The Left (disambiguation)